Faulkner is an unincorporated community in Osceola Township, Franklin County, Iowa, United States.

History
Founded in the 1800s, Faulkner's population was 16 in 1902, and 54 in 1925.

References

Unincorporated communities in Franklin County, Iowa
Unincorporated communities in Iowa